, also known as AltimaA, and subtitled "Ultimate Magazine that you are crazy about," is a defunct Japanese manga magazine published by Kadokawa Shoten. Altima Ace was a spinoff sister magazine to Kadokawa Shoten's Young Ace. The first issue was released on October 18, 2011, and was scheduled to publish bimonthly in Japan on the 18th day of even-numbered months, priced at 580 yen. 

On October 18, 2012, after a one-year run, Kadakowa announced that it was ending publication of Altima Ace with the November 2012 issue. A total of seven bimonthly issues were published in all. Five of its continuing manga stories were moved to Monthly Asuka, including Biblia Koshodou no Jiken and Fate/Zero Kuro, and an additional three titles were to be transferred to Young Ace.

Serialized manga
Bakudan Handan by Otomate and Yamaguch Kyounosuke
Kami-sama☆Permanent by Jinsei Kataoka and Kazuma Kondou
Biblia Koshodō no Jiken Techō (Biblia Used Bookstore Casebook) (ビブリア古書堂の事件手帖) by Nakano, based on the light novels by En Mikami
Baka ga Zenra de Yattekuru by Hiroto Ida
Busta! by Eiri Iwamoto
 The Intrigues of Koizumi Itsuki-kun by Puyo
Mahou Shounen no Sodatekata by Yuu Mori
Fate/Zero Kuro by mendori
Kangaero by Mayu Taumi

References

2011 establishments in Japan
2012 disestablishments in Japan
Bi-monthly manga magazines published in Japan
Defunct magazines published in Japan
Kadokawa Shoten magazines
Magazines established in 2011
Magazines disestablished in 2012
Magazines published in Tokyo
Shōjo manga magazines